Frank P. Sillin (May 15, 1903 – December 29, 1932) was an American football player. He played college football at Western Maryland as a fullback from 1924 to 1926 and was captain of the school's 1926 team.  He later professional football in the National Football League (NFL) as a back for the Dayton Triangles. He appeared in 17 NFL games, 12 as a starter, during the 1921, 1927, 1928, and 1929 seasons. He died in 1932 at age 29 of influenza and pneumonia.

References

1903 births
1932 deaths
Dayton Triangles players
Players of American football from Ohio
Deaths from influenza
Deaths from pneumonia in Ohio